This is a timeline of space exploration including notable achievements, first accomplishments and milestones in humanity's exploration of outer space.

Pre-20th century

1900–1956

1957–1959

1960–1969

1970–1979

1980–1989

1990–1999

2000–2009

Since 2010

Notes

See also
 Discovery and exploration of the Solar System 
 Timeline of Solar System exploration – A comprehensive list of events in the exploration of the Solar System.
 Timeline of artificial satellites and space probes – A comprehensive list of artificial satellites and space probes.
 Timeline of space travel by nationality 
 Timeline of spaceflight – Chronological list of events in spaceflight broken down as a separate article for each year
 Timeline of private spaceflight – For first achievements by private space companies

References

External links
 Chronology of Space Exploration archive of important space exploration missions and events, including future planned and proposed endeavors
 Crewed spaceflight 1961-1980
 Crewed spaceflight chronology
 History of crewed space missions 
 Timeline of the Space Race/Moon Race
 Chronology: Moon Race at russianspaceweb.com
 Space Timeline in 3d

Spaceflight timelines

Lists of firsts in space